In music, Op. 55 stands for Opus number 55. Compositions that are assigned this number include:

 Beethoven – Symphony No. 3
 Brahms – Triumphlied
 Chopin – Nocturnes, Op. 55
 Alkan - Une fusee, Op. 55
 Elgar – Symphony No. 1
 Glazunov – Symphony No. 5
 Ippolitov-Ivanov – Turkish March
 Klebe – Das Märchen von der schönen Lilie
 Krenek – Schwergewicht
 Madetoja – Symphony No. 3
 Mendelssohn – Antigone
 Nielsen – Tre Motetter
 Prokofiev – Piano Concerto No. 5
 Ries – Piano Concerto No. 3
 Schumann – 5 Lieder
 Sibelius – Nightride and Sunrise
 Szymanowski – Harnasie
 Tchaikovsky – Orchestral Suite No. 3